Acidianus infernus  is a species of archaeon. It is aerobic, extremely acidophilic, thermophilic (hence its name) and sulfur-metabolizing. Its type strain is strain DSM 3191.

References

External links

LPSN
Type strain of Acidianus infernus at BacDive -  the Bacterial Diversity Metadatabase

Acidophiles
Archaea described in 1986
Thermoproteota